†Carelia kalalauensis was a species of small, air-breathing, land snail, a terrestrial pulmonate gastropod mollusk in the family  Amastridae, and superfamily Cochlicopoidea.

This species was endemic to the Hawaiian Islands.

References

Carelia (gastropod)
Extinct gastropods
Taxonomy articles created by Polbot